Gareth Huw McKinley  is Professor of Teaching Innovation in the Department of Mechanical Engineering at  Massachusetts Institute of Technology (MIT).

Education
McKinley was educated at the University of Cambridge where he was awarded a Bachelor of Arts (BA) degree followed by a Master of Engineering (MEng) degree as a student of Downing College, Cambridge. He moved to America to complete his PhD at Massachusetts Institute of Technology supervised by Robert C. Armstrong.

Research and career
McKinley's work focuses on understanding the rheology of complex fluids such as surfactants, gels and polymers, which are ubiquitous in foods and consumer products. His research interests include non-Newtonian fluid dynamics, microfluidics, extensional rheology, field-responsive materials, super-hydrophobicity and the wetting of nanostructured surfaces.

McKinley served as director of MIT's program in polymer science & Technology  (PPST) from 2004-2009. McKinley is also co-founder of Cambridge Polymer Group, a Boston-based company employing 20 people and specializing in bespoke instrumentation, materials consulting and orthopedic polymeric materials.

Awards and honours
McKinley was awarded the 2013 Bingham Medal from the Society of Rheology and the 2014 Gold Medal of the British Society of Rheology. He served as editor of the Journal of Non-Newtonian Fluid Mechanics (JNNFM)  from 1999 to 2009.
 A passionate educator, he has won the Bose Award for Teaching and the Jacob Pieter Den Hartog Outstanding Educator Award from MIT. He was elected a member of the National Academy of Engineering of the United States in 2019.

References

Fellows of the Royal Society
Year of birth missing (living people)
Living people
MIT School of Engineering faculty
Massachusetts Institute of Technology alumni